La Fuga is a Spanish rock band from Reinosa, Cantabria that formed in the summer of 1996. It is composed by Xavi Moreno (voice and guitar), Nando (guitar), Raúl (bass) and Edu (drums). They have realized more than 600 concerts in ten tours, and they have published 10 albums to date.

Formation and beginnings 
The group started to play in 1997. In the month of September, the band, formed then by Edu (drums), Rulo (lead vocals and guitar), Fito (guitar and backing vocals) and Iñaki (bass), started to give their first concerts in Reinosa and other places of Cantabria and Palencia.

First disc: Mira 
After the great success of their demo, they started giving more and more concerts in more cities out of their locality, even playing in Madrid. More and more people started going to their concerts, and they asked for their own songs. Because of this they decided to record their first studio album called Mira, which was released in 1998.

To raise funds for the recording, they went to the city hall of Reinosa to request for some help, and they were hired to give two concerts there getting like this the necessary quantity of money to record in Navarra, in the  Sonido XXI studies, with San Martín brothers. Half of the costs of the album were paid by the members, whereas the other half was paid for by an independent seal of Santander, FAK Records.

As collaboration, José Romero, guitar tech of the band, recorded a solo in «sueños».

For family and financial reasons, Fito had to abandon the band. It was then when Nando joined as a guitarist, participating on the record. Tanks to this, La Fuga realized their first tour, with more than 80 concerts, in different Spanish provinces.

Un juguete por navidad 
In the year 1998 Fito participated with the group as a guest in a benefit concert organized by the band, which managed to fill the Teatro Municipal of Reinosa. The quartet played their own songs and covers of songs by other rock bands, such as Platero y tú, Maná or Los Suaves. The actuation was recorded for the album Un juguete por Navidad, launched as a special limited signed edition, with just 1000 copies.

After the concert, the members of the group asked Fito to return, and he accepted. This way the structure of the band changed, Nando kept playing the guitar, Edu the drums, Rulo kept singing, Fito played the guitar and sang and Iñaki played the bass, but the last one abandoned the group, it stayed like this until 2009 when Rulo decided to leave the group followed by Fito.
Shortly before releasing the album, Rulo took his role as bass, in addition to singing and playing the harmonica.

A golpes... de rock and roll 
They were still looking for a record when in the year 2000 they decided to ask for a credit to auto produce their second studio album, A golpes de Rock and Roll. In the months of March and April they also started recording in Sonido XXI, releasing the album in June, they started a tour with good results.

During the tour, the San Martín brothers (the owners of the studio) asked La Fuga to sign a contract with EDG Music, and record two albums with them. The group signed the contract because this would open the doors for their music and because the amity they maintained with the brothers.

A las doce 

In 2001, and after some months composing new songs and recording demos, the band went back to Navarra to record A las doce. They recorded the album in just two weeks, with better equipment than before.

Besides, the tour was bigger than other years, with about 60 concerts, going to important national festivals, such as ViñaRock and Derrame Rock, where they won new fans.

Aurora Beltrán also participated with them on the track «Balada del despertador», and their first music videos were recorded: «Pa volar» y «Conversación, habitación».

Calles de papel 
They still had not any contract with EDG to record a new studio album, when they started to receive calls of other important record companies. This company, encouraging the group to continue with their plans, did not put any problem to avoid the signing of the band with a multinational company Dro-Atlantic.

Calles de papel, launched in May 2003, included a video with images of the tour of 2002. The work was highlighted by the maturity of the quartet.  They also recorded a video to «En vela» in Madrid. The disc got very high sales, getting in the list of AFYVE (now Promusicae) in their first week.

In this occasion, the invited artists were Fito Cabrales, whose voice appear in «Sueños de papel», and Kutxi Romero, whose voice appears in «Los lunes de octubre».

The tour was bigger than the ones before, with the name of Calles de Papel Tour they gave 82 concerts all over the national territory, finishing in Las Ventas, with Fito & Fitipaldis, with a great reception between the public.

In the same year they participated on a tribute to Barricada, called Un camino de piedras: un homenaje a Barricada, aporting their versión of «Pasión por el ruido». In 2004 they appeared in other tribute, in this time to Radio Futura, recording a version of «37 grados».

Negociando gasolina 
In April 2005 they launched Negociando gasolina, and they became more famous with the first single «Buscando en la Basura».

In this occasion, between the contributors are El Drogas, of Barricada, in «Baja por diversión», and  Laura, from a group of Cantabria, who does the chorus on «Amor de contenedor».

The tour started a month later than the output of the disc, and they arrived to all the places of Spain.

La Fuga en directo 
After the tour of Negociando Gasolina, the quartet decided to record alive in the auditorium Aqualung. In two concerts, the days  9 and 10 December 2005, they recorded audio and video for the DVD La Fuga en directo, which went on sale in 2006, starting with it a new tour.

Nubes y claros 

The band decided to make an experiment with their old songs, making an acoustic disc called Nubes y Claros, which went on sale in 2006. They included new instruments: violins, flutes, accordions... Nando, in the reportage La Fuga: diez años defined the disc as something strange. They also did different versions of their old songs and a version of «Donde habita el olvido», of Joaquín Sabina.

The announced an acoustic mini-tour, using all the new instruments they had used in their new disc, with a special staging due to the different auditoriums in where they played.

The disc included a special DVD with videos and reportages.

For the first time in their career, they realized a tour out of Spain. In May and September 2007, they visited Argentina, Uruguay and Chile, countries in where they had a great reception and they played with the Uruguayan band La Chancha and the Argentineans Bulldog.

Asuntos pendientes 
After 3 years without releasing a studio album, La Fuga announced Asuntos Pendientes, their new studio album. This time the production was bigger than anyone before, they even were title page in an important magazine: HeavyRock.

The disc was on a part conditioned by the tour all over South America: some songs were written during the tour, and it is seen in the lyrics the surprise of the group when they realized about the lifestyle of some of the people of the zone.

The first single, «No sólo respirar», changes a lot the rhythm comparing to their other songs, is the fastest. The video was recorded in the same place that «Polvo en los ojos», of Soziedad Alkohólika.

In the tour they went again to ViñaRock. They also played at the Mediatic Festival.

Changes 
27 October 2009, la Fuga announced that Rulo, bassist and vocalist, was leaving the band. But the group continued doing music as always.

Later, in June 2010 Fito also abandoned La Fuga to play with Rulo.

The separation of the band created two bands:

 In one hand Rulo and Fito created a band called Rulo y la contrabanda, headed by Raúl (Rulo).
 In the other hand, La Fuga continued, in 2010 presenting  Pedro (ex—Mr. Fylyn) as the new voice and Raúl Serrano as the bassist. They released a studio album called Raíces on 8 March 2011.

Raíces 
After their rupture they released a new album with their new line-up consisting out of: Pedro, Nando, Edu and Raúl.

Band members

Current members 
 Pedro: Lead vocals and guitar (2010 – present).
 Nando: Guitar (1998 – present)
 Raúl Serrano: Bass (2010 – present)
 Edu: Drums (1996 – present)

Former members 
 Raúl Gutiérrez "Rulo" lead vocals and guitar (1996-1999);bass (1999-2009)
 Adolfo Garmendia "Fito": guitar and backing vocals (1996-1998, 1998-2010)
 Iñaki Durán (1996-1999)

Discography

Studio albums 
 Mira (1998).
 A golpes de Rock and Roll (2000).
 A las doce (2001).
 Calles de papel (2003).
 Negociando gasolina (2005).
 La Fuga en directo (Auditorium Aqualung of Madrid) (2006).
 Nubes y claros (Acoustic) (2006).
 Asuntos pendientes (2008).
 Raíces (2011)
 Más de cien amaneceres (2013)

Models 
 El camino (1997).
 Un juguete por navidad (Limited edition) (1999).

DVD 
 La Fuga en directo (Auditorium Aqualung of Madrid) (2006).

Collaborations 
 2003- "Pasión por el ruido": Collaboration in Un camino de piedras. A tribute to Barricada.
 2004- "37 grados": Collaboration in Arde la Calle. A tribute to Radio Futura.

Notes

External links 
 Sitio web oficial

Spanish rock music groups
Musical groups established in 1996
Musical quartets